Cosmetra spiculifera is a species of moth of the family Tortricidae first described by Edward Meyrick in 1913. It is found in the Democratic Republic of the Congo, Cameroon, South Africa, Gabon, Ghana, Réunion, Mauritius and Nigeria.

This species has a wingspan of 11–14 mm, and is light ochreous with some grey suffusion along the dorsum, hindwings with blackish suffused veins.

References

Moths described in 1913
Olethreutini